Leslie Wing Pomeroy (born September 16, 1963), also known as Leslie Wing, is an American actress and small business owner.

Career
Wing played the role of Lucille Bolton, mother of Troy Bolton (Zac Efron) in the High School Musical trilogy. She also starred in the 1984 film The Dungeonmaster.  

She was one of the final three actresses — along with Jennifer Beals (who was selected) and Demi Moore — considered for the lead role of Alex Owens in Flashdance.

Personal life
As of 2015, she lives in Lafayette, Colorado, where she is a small business owner and owns a popular coffee shop called East Simpson Coffee Company.

Filmography

Film

Television

References

External links

Living people
American film actresses
American television actresses
Year of birth missing (living people)
21st-century American women